The following is a list of gay, lesbian, bisexual and/or transgender individuals who have been elected as members of the Bundestag, European Union, state parliaments, parliaments of the countries that preceded the modern Federal Republic of Germany.

Federal Cabinet 

 1970 Michael Roth (Member of the Bundestag, SPD, Hesse, former Minister of State for Europe)
 1980 Jens Spahn (Member of the Bundestag, CDU, North Rhine-Westphalia, former Federal Minister of Health)
 1952 Barbara Hendricks (former MP, former Federal Environment Minister, SPD, North Rhine-Westphalia)
 1961 Guido Westerwelle (former MP, FDP, former Foreign Minister, North Rhine-Westphalia)

Bundestag 

 1949 Thomas Sattelberger (FDP, Bavaria)
 1965 Ursula Schauws (Green Party, North Rhine-Westphalia)
 1966 Jürgen Lenders (FDP, Hesse)
 1968 Matthias Miersch (SPD, Lower Saxony)
 1970 Michael Roth (SPD, Hesse, former Minister of State for Europe)
 1973 Falko Droßmann (SPD, Hamburg)
 1974 Lars Castellucci (SPD, Baden-Württemberg)
 1976 Timon Gremmels (SPD, Hesse)
 1979 Alice Weidel (AfD, Baden-Württemberg)
 1979 Sven Lehmann (Green Party, North Rhine-Westphalia)
 1980 Jens Spahn (CDU, North Rhine-Westphalia, former Federal Minister of Health)
 1984 Andreas Audretsch (Green Party, Berlin)
 1984 Falko Mohrs (SPD, Lower Saxony)
 1985 Matthias Mieves (SPD, Rhineland-Palatinate)
 1986 Jens Brandenburg (FDP, Baden-Württemberg)
 1989 Kevin Kühnert (SPD, Berlin, former Juso federal chairman)
 1989 Konstantin Kuhle (FDP, Lower Saxony)
 1990 Marlene Schönberger (Greens, Bavaria)
 1991 Takis Mehmet Ali (SPD, Baden-Württemberg)
 1992 Jan Plobner (SPD, Bavaria)
 1994 Carlos Kasper (SPD, Saxony)
 1994 Ricarda Lang (Greens, Baden-Württemberg, federal party chairwoman)
 1996 Bruno Hönel (Green Party, Schleswig-Holstein)
 1997 Max Lucks (Green Party, North Rhine-Westphalia)
 Nyke Slawik (Green Party, North Rhine-Westphalia)
 Tessa Ganserer (Green Party, Bavaria)

Former 

 1941 Jutta Oesterle-Schwerin (former MP, Greens)
 1947 Jörg van Essen (former MP, FDP, North Rhine-Westphalia)
 1952 Barbara Hendricks (former MP, former Federal Environment Minister, SPD, North Rhine-Westphalia)
 1952 Christian Schenk (former MP, 1994-2002, now Trans, Greens, PDS)
 1952 Herbert Rusche (former MP, Greens/Pirates, Hesse)
 1953 Karl-Heinz Brunner (former MP, SPD, Bavaria)
 1954 Reinhold Robbe (former MP, SPD, Lower Saxony)
 1956 Birgitt Bender (former MP, Greens, Baden-Württemberg)
 1957 Uwe Schummer (former MP, CDU, North Rhine-Westphalia)
 1960 Volker Beck (former MP, Greens, North Rhine-Westphalia)
 1960 Bettina Herlitzius (former MP, Green Party, North Rhine-Westphalia)
 1961 Guido Westerwelle (former MP, FDP, former Foreign Minister, North Rhine-Westphalia)
 1962 Harald Petzold (former MP, Left Party, Brandenburg)
 1963 Anja Hajduk (former MP, Green Party, Hamburg)
 1963 Johannes Kahrs (former MP, SPD, Hamburg)
 1964 Achim Kessler (former MP, Left Party, Hesse)
 1965 Bernd Fabritius (former MP, CSU, Bavaria)
 1966 Lutz Heilmann (former MP, Left Party, Schleswig-Holstein)
 1967 Michael Kauch (former MP, FDP, North Rhine-Westphalia)
 1968 Wolfgang Wetzel (former MP, Greens, Saxony)
 1969 Stefan Kaufmann (former MP, CDU, BaWü)
 1969 Sebastian Edathy (former MP, SPD, Lower Saxony)
 1972 Gerhard Schick (former MP, Greens, Baden-Württemberg)
 1973 Sabine Jiinger (former MP and MP, Linke, Mecklenburg-West Pomerania)
 1975 Matthias Höhn (former MP, Left Party, Saxony-Anhalt)
 1976 Doris Achelwilm (former MP, Left Party, Bremen)

State-level 

 1948 Stephan Holthoff-Pförtner (Member of the Landtag, State Minister for European Affairs, CDU, North Rhine-Westphalia)
 1962 Farid Müller (Member of the Bundestag, Green Party, Hamburg)
 1964 Frank-Christian Hansel (Member of the Bundestag, AfD, Berlin)
 1966 Heiner Garg (Member of the Landtag, FDP, Schleswig-Holstein, State Chairman of the FDP Schleswig-Holstein, former State Minister)
 1970 Carsten Schatz (Member of the Bundestag, Left Party, Berlin)
 1971 Arndt Klocke (Member of the Landtag, Greens, North Rhine-Westphalia)
 1973 Kai Klose (Member of the Landtag, Greens, Hesse)
 1973 Arne Platzbecker (Member of the Landtag, SPD, Hamburg)
 1973 Jennifer Schubert (Member of the Landtag, Green Party, Thuringia)
 1974 Thomas de Jesus Fernandes (Member of the Landtag, Afd, Mecklenburg-West Pomerania)
 1974 Klaus Lederer (Member of the Bundestag, Left Party, Berlin)
 1975 Matthias Höhn (Member of the Landtag, Left Party, Saxony-Anhalt)
 1975 Daniel Wesener (Member of the Bundestag, Green Party, Berlin)
 1978 Tom Schreiber (Member of the Bundestag, SPD, Berlin)
 1962 Detlev Schulz-Hendel (Member of the Landtag, B90/Greens, Lower Saxony)
 1979 Katja Meier (Member of the Landtag, Greens/Bündnis 90, Sachsen)
 1979 Sebastian Walter (Member of the Bundestag, Green Party, Berlin)
 1980 Stefan Evers (Member of the Bundestag, CDU, Berlin)
 1981 Sven Tritschler (Member of the Landtag, AfD, North Rhine-Westphalia)
 1982 Josefine Paul (Member of the Landtag, Green Party, North Rhine-Westphalia)
 1982 Dennis Paustian-Döscher (Member of the Landtag, Green Party, Hamburg)
 1984 Stefan Gruhner (Member of the Landtag, CDU, Thuringia)
 1985 René Gögge (Member of the Landtag, Greens, Hamburg)
 1989 Vanessa Gronemann (Member of the Landtag, Greens, Hesse)
 1990 Moritz Körner (Member of the Landtag, FDP, North Rhine-Westphalia)
 1991 Simon Kuchinke (Member of the Landtag, SPD, Hamburg)
 1995 Felix Martin (Member of the Landtag, Greens, Hesse)

Former 

 1939 Helga Schuchardt (former minister, FDP/free, Hamburg, Lower Saxony)
 1949 Ute Pape (Member of the Bundestag, former Senator, SPD, Hamburg)
 1950 Anne Klein (Member of the Bundestag, former senator, independent, Berlin)
 1953 Klaus Wowereit (former Governing Mayor = Prime Minister, SPD, Berlin)
 1955 Ole von Beust (former Mayor, CDU, Hamburg)
 1954 Roger Kusch (former Justice Senator, CDU, Hamburg)
 1959 Karin Wolff (former Hessian Minister of Education, CDU, Hesse)
 1960 Anja Kofbinger (former MdA, Green Party, Berlin)
 1960 Peter Kurth (former MdA and Senator, CDU, Berlin)
 1960 Lutz Johannsen (former MdHB, SPD, Hamburg)
 1960 Albert Eckert (former MdA, Greens (non-party), Berlin)
 1961 Sibyll-Anka Klotz (former MP, Greens, Berlin, city councilor)
 1964 Dietrich Wersich (Member of the Landtag, CDU, Hamburg)
 1966 Hakan Taş (former MdA, Left Party, Berlin)
 1968 Markus Klaer (former MdA, CDU, Berlin)
 1968 Andreas Matthae (state party, SPD, Berlin)
 1970 Alexander Tassis (former MdBB, AfD, Bremen)
 1971 Dirk Behrendt (former MdA, Green Party, Berlin)
 1972 Chris Bollenbach (former MdA, CDU, North Rhine-Westphalia, 2005-2010)
 1972 Gerwald Claus-Brunner (Member of the Bundestag, Pirate Party Germany, Berlin)
 1973 Holger Arppe (former MdL, Mecklenburg-West Pomerania, former City Councilor, former AfD, Rostock)
 1973 Roland Heintze (Member of the Bundestag, CDU, Hamburg)
 1973 Sabine Jiinger (former MdA, Linke, Mecklenburg-West Pomerania)
 1973 Jan Stöß (former MdA, former SPD state chairman Berlin)
 1973 Marc Ratajczak (Member of the Landtag, CDU, North Rhine-Westphalia)
 1975 Sascha Steuer (former Berlin House of Representatives, CDU)
 1977 Philipp-Sebastian Kühn (Member of the Bundestag, SPD, Hamburg)
 1978 Andreas Baum (Member of the Bundestag, Pirate Party Germany, Berlin)
 1979 Patrick Schreiber (Member of the Bundestag, CDU, Saxony)
 1982 Robert Bläsing (Member of the Bundestag, FDP, Hamburg)

Municipal-level 
 1960 Peter Kurth (candidate for mayor, CDU, Cologne)
 1960 Reinhard Naumann (district mayor of Charlottenburg-Willmersdorf, Berlin, SPD)
 1961 Thomas Niederbühl (City Councilor, Pink List, Bay, Munich)
 1962 Pit Clausen (Mayor, SPD, NRW, Bielefeld)
 1964 Monika Herrmann (district mayor of Friedrichshain-Kreuzberg, Alliance 90/The Greens, Berlin)
 1967 Michael Ebling (Mayor, SPD, Rhineland-Palatinate:Mainz)
 1968 Helmut Metzner (FDP, Berlin)
 1973 Thomas Kufen (CDU, Essen)
 1973 Christian Vorländer (SPD, Munich)
 1974 Sven Gerich (Mayor, SPD, Wiesbaden)
 1978 Silvio Witt (independent, mayor of Neubrandenburg)
 1984 Michael Adam (current district administrator Regen, former mayor, SPD, Bay, Bodenmais)
 1986 Oliver Gortat (mayor, free voters, Baden-Württemberg, municipality of Sipplingen on Lake Constance)
 1970 Torsten Ilg (Cologne City Council, Free Voters Cologne FWK)
 Michael Gabel (City Council) (City Council, Citizens' Movement pro Cologne, Party Chairman)
 1989 Felix Heinrichs (SPD, Mayor of Mönchengladbach)

Former 
 1949 Alexander Miklosy (former district chairman of Ludwigsvorstadt-Isarvorstadt, Pink List, Bay, Munich)
 1956 Rolf Ohler (former city councillor, CDU, Wiesbaden)
 1961 Hermann Brem (former chairman of the Young Liberals, later Bündnis 90/Die Grünen, Munich)
 1968 Andreas Matthae (former district chairman, SPD, Berlin-Kreuzberg)

Germany